Kozhippalam is the host karala (land) for Aranmula Uthrattadi Vallamkali. It is a small village in Pathanamthitta district of Central Travancore region (South Central Kerala) in Kerala state, South India. Kozhippalam is situated in between Aranmula and Malakkara. The name Kozhippalam is derived from the words Kovil and Paalam which means Temple and Bridge respectively, refers to the bridge in the path to Aranmula Parthasarathy Temple.

References 

Villages in Pathanamthitta district